The Palestinian Authority Passport is a passport/travel document issued since April 1995 by the Palestinian Authority to Palestinian residents of the Palestinian territories for the purpose of international travel.

The Palestinian Authority passport is available to anyone on production of a birth certificate showing that they were born in Palestine. What constitutes "Palestine" for this purpose is not clear. In practice, only residents of areas under the Palestinian Authority jurisdiction can apply. Palestinians born outside of Palestinian authority to a Palestinian citizen can also apply for this passport. Exceptions are possible; for example Daniel Barenboim, born in Argentina of Jewish parents, and a citizen of Argentina, Israel, and Spain, has been granted Palestinian citizenship and passport.

However, the passport issuance is subject to additional restrictions imposed by the Israeli government. Israel asserts that the requirement is permitted for security needs under the Interim Agreement.

History

Between 1924 and 1948, the term "Palestinian passport" referred to the travel documents that were available to residents of British Mandate Palestine. Issued by the High Commissioner for Palestine, they were officially titled, "British passport, Palestine". These passports became invalid with the termination of the British mandate on 15 May 1948. Israeli and Jordanian passports were offered to former British Mandate subjects according to the citizenship they acquired in the aftermath of the 1948 Arab-Israeli War. A significant number of Palestinian Arabs, especially in the Gaza Strip and those who found refuge in Syria and Lebanon, remained stateless, as Egypt, Syria and Lebanon did not allow them to integrate as citizens.

The Egyptian-controlled All-Palestine Government issued All-Palestine passports between 1949 and 1959 to Palestinian residents of the Gaza Strip and Egypt. However, passport holders were not permitted to move freely into Egypt. In the meantime, Transjordan annexed the West Bank and Palestinian residents of the West Bank became citizens of Jordan, and were entitled to a Jordanian passport.

After the 1967 Six-Day War, during which Israel captured the West Bank from Jordan, Palestinian Arabs living there continued to have the right to apply for Jordanian passports and live in Jordan. Palestinian refugees actually living in Jordan were also considered full Jordanian citizens. In July 1988, Jordan severed all legal and administrative ties with the West Bank. Any Palestinian living in Jordan would remain a Jordanian citizen; but residents of the West Bank would not.

Jordan continued to issue passports to Palestinians in the West Bank, but they were for travel purposes only and not as indication of citizenship. Palestinians in the West Bank who had regular Jordanian passports were issued with temporary ones upon expiration of the old ones, and entry into Jordan by Palestinians became time-limited and considered for tourism purposes only.

On 2 April 1995, two years after the Oslo Accords of 1993, the Palestinian Authority started issuing Palestinian Authority passports to the public in the self-ruling areas of Gaza and Jericho. These passports retained the personal ID number issued by the Israeli Civil Administration.

Starting September 1st 2022, The Palestinian Ministry of Interior (responsible for issuing Palestinian passports) started issuing Biometric Passports. The passport contains a digitalized photo, fingerprints and signature of the holder.

Implications of the passport

Palestinians regard the passport as a 'crucial symbol of nationhood.' The recognition of the passports by other countries has been cited as evidence of recognition by them of the State of Palestine and/or Palestinian nationality and citizenship. 

As of 1997, Palestinian passports were not issued in the name of the State of Palestine. Some countries, including the United States, recognize Palestinian Authority passports as travel documents, though the recognition of the passports does not imply recognition by them of citizenship, since they are not issued by a government which they recognize. Egypt, Jordan and the United Arab Emirates have indicated only (in May 2002) that the passports, along with valid visas or other necessary papers, would allow their holders to travel to their countries.

Passport types 
There are three types of Palestinian passport, which are issued by the Palestinian National Authority, and they are as follows: 

 The diplomatic passport (Colour: Red) It is granted to the political, economic, religious and security high leaders, in addition to members of the diplomatic corps and cases granted by the President of the Palestinian National Authority or the Prime Minister. 
 The ordinary passport (Colour: Black), which is the passport that is given to Palestinians living in the West Bank and Gaza Strip, and contains the identity number and other information. Its validity period extends to 5 years, but sometimes there are complications for the residents of East Jerusalem because they hold Israeli identity and Jordanian passports. 
 The Palestinian refugee passport, which is the same as the ordinary passport, and is given to Palestinian refugees residing in Syria,  Lebanon, Iraq, and the rest of the diaspora countries who do not have an identity card in the territories. They are issued by Palestinian embassies in those countries.

Visa-free entry 
According to the 2018 Arten Basic Passport Classification Index, the Palestinian passport allows entry to 44 countries without a visa or through a visa upon arrival at the airport, and the countries as follows:

Passport note

The document contains a note on the second page (inside of the cover) stating:

English
THIS PASSPORT/TRAVEL DOCUMENT IS ISSUED PERSUANT [sic] TO THE PALESTINIAN SELF GOVERNMENT AGREEMENT ACCORDING TO OSLO AGREEMENT SIGNED IN WASHINGTON ON 13/9/1993.
IT IS REQUIRED FROM THOSE WHOM IT MIGHT CONCERN TO ALLOW THE BEARER OF THIS PASSPORT/TRAVEL DOCUMENT TO PASS FREELY WITHOUT LET AND HINDRANCE AND TO AFFORD HIM (HER) SUCH ASSISTANCE AND PROTECTION AS MAY BE NECESSARY. ''

See also
 Palestinian Declaration of Independence
 Visa requirements for Palestinian citizens

References

Passports by country
National symbols of the State of Palestine
Foreign relations of the State of Palestine